The Short Silver Streak was the first British all-metal aircraft. It was designed and built by Short Brothers at Rochester, Kent, England.
Although Flight magazine claimed that it was the first instance of stressed skin construction in the world, it was preceded by a number of Dornier designs, including the Dornier-Zeppelin D.I, which was ordered into production.

Development
The Silver Streak was a single-seat biplane with a semi-monocoque duralumin fuselage and duralumin-covered wings. The wing skin was not stressed. The Silver Streak had a conventional landing gear and was powered by a  Siddeley Puma engine. The Silver Streak was exhibited in July 1920 at the Olympia in London. Registered G-EARQ, it was first flown at Grain on 20 August 1920 by test pilot J. L. Parker. It was later modified as a two-seater and delivered to the Air Ministry in February 1921 for both flight and static testing. The Air Ministry issued a specification for a two-seat reconnaissance biplane and Shorts produced the Springbok based on the Silver Streak.

Specifications

See also

References

Notes

Bibliography

External links

Norwegian archive images of Silver Streak showing structural details
"Shorts Silver Streak, all metal aeroplane" FLIGHT, 10 November 1921, complete 3 view photos of Silver Streak, bottom half of page 736

1920s British experimental aircraft
Silver Streak
Aircraft first flown in 1920
Biplanes
Single-engined tractor aircraft
Conventional landing gear